Eva Sletto (6 September 1912 – 7 March 2006) was a Norwegian actress. She worked at Det Norske Teatret from 1936 to 1983. She is best known for her role as Milja in the film Ungen (The Baby) by Oskar Braaten in 1938, and also played Ismene in Sophocles' Antigone, Titania in Shakespeare's A Midsummer Night's Dream and Olga in Chekhov's Three Sisters. Sletto also played in several movies in the early age of Norwegian cinema. She retired from the stage in 1983, and lived in Oslo until her death at the age of 93.

Select filmography
Dei svarte hestane (1951) as Lisle Førnes
Vigdis (1943) as Vigdis Bjørkli
Trysil-Knut (1942)
Gullfjellet (1941) as Randi
Godvakker-Maren (1940) as Maren
Hu Dagmar (1939) as Ingeborg
Ungen (1938) as Milja
Norge for folket (1936)

References

External links

1912 births
2006 deaths
Norwegian film actresses
Norwegian stage actresses
20th-century Norwegian actresses
People from Asker